Shenyang South railway station is a railway station on the  Harbin–Dalian high-speed railway and Shenyang–Dandong intercity railway scheduled to open in 2015. It is in the Hunnan New Area district of Shenyang, Liaoning, China.

See also

Shenyang railway station
Shenyang North railway station

References

Railway stations in Liaoning
Transport in Shenyang
Buildings and structures in Shenyang